Jim Clunie (4 September 1933 — 12 May 2003) was a Scottish football player and manager.

Clunie played in three cup finals for Aberdeen. These were the 1954 and 1959 Scottish Cup Finals, which they lost 2–1 to Celtic and 3–1 to St Mirren, and the 1955 Scottish League Cup Final which Aberdeen won 2–1 against St Mirren. He transferred to St Mirren in 1960, for whom he played in the 1962 Scottish Cup Final.

Clunie was the first player to be substituted in a Scottish match, when he was replaced by Archie Gemmill after 23 minutes of the Scottish League Cup tie against Clyde on 13 August 1966.

In 1976, Clunie was a coach at Southampton when the club won the FA Cup by beating Manchester United 1-0 in the 1976 FA Cup Final.

Clunie went on to manage St Mirren from 1978 to 1981, replacing Alex Ferguson. He took St Mirren into Europe for the first time ever after they finished third in the league in 1981. Clunie also managed Kilmarnock from 1981 to 1985.

References

External links 

1933 births
2003 deaths
Scottish footballers
Raith Rovers F.C. players
Aberdeen F.C. players
St Mirren F.C. players
Bury F.C. players
Forfar Athletic F.C. players
Ballymena United F.C. players
Grimsby Town F.C. non-playing staff
Scottish football managers
St Mirren F.C. managers
Kilmarnock F.C. managers
Scottish Football League players
English Football League players
NIFL Premiership players
Scottish Football League representative players
Association football central defenders
Scottish Football League managers